Aikhead is a hamlet in Cumbria, England, within the Lake District. It is about one and a half miles northwest of Wigton, and is in the civil parish of Woodside in Allerdale district. The hamlet was the residence of John Rooke, an English geologist.

References

Hamlets in Cumbria
Allerdale